Madonna is an American singer, songwriter, and actress who has received many awards and nominations. Her first nomination from a major award ceremony was Best New Artist at the 1984 MTV Video Music Awards (VMA) for "Borderline" from her debut album Madonna (1983). "Lucky Star", which she single-handedly wrote for the album, earned Madonna her first songwriting honor from the American Society of Composers, Authors and Publishers (ASCAP). Due to the success of her second album, Like a Virgin (1984), she won seven categories at the 1985 Billboard Number One Awards, including Top Pop Artist of the Year. The 1985 soundtrack single "Crazy for You" gave Madonna her first Grammy nomination for Best Female Pop Vocal Performance. Madonna received many accolades at the international level after the release of her third album, True Blue (1986), including Artist of the Year and Grand Prix Album of the Year at the Japan Gold Disc Awards as well as International Album of the Year at Canada's Juno Awards. At the 1986 VMAs, she become the first woman to receive the Video Vanguard Award.

Madonna continued winning the VMA trophies with her critically acclaimed album, Like a Prayer (1989), but it was snubbed at the Grammy Awards. By the end of the 1980s, Madonna was named the Artist of the Decade by several media such as MTV, Billboard, and Musician magazine. In 1990, the Hollywood Walk of Fame committee decided to award Madonna with a star on the Hollywood Boulevard sidewalk, but she turned down the nomination. The Blond Ambition World Tour won the award for Most Creative Stage Production at the 1990 Pollstar Awards. Madonna also won her first Grammy Award in the category of Best Long Form Music Video, for the video release of the tour. In 1998, Madonna released her most-awarded album Ray of Light, which earned her three Grammy trophies as well as nominations for Album of the Year and Record of the Year. At the 1998 VMAs, Madonna won six categories, including Video of the Year. In 1999, "Beautiful Stranger" gave Madonna her 20th VMA win, more than any other artist in history until Beyoncé surpassing the record in 2016.

Madonna won her first Brit Award for International Female Solo Artist following the release of her eighth studio album, Music (2000). She received the same award after the release of Confessions on a Dance Floor (2005), which also earned her the Grammy Award for Best Electronic/Dance Album. Madonna won her seventh Grammy Award for The Confessions Tour (2007). During the 2000s, Madonna was honored four times at the Billboard Touring Awards, including Top Tour twice, for the 2004 Re-Invention World Tour and the 2009 leg of the Sticky & Sweet Tour. Her lengthy career achievement was also acknowledged by France's NRJ Awards in 2004 and the MTV TRL Awards in 2006. She was inducted into the UK Music Hall of Fame in 2004 (as one of its five founding members) and the Rock and Roll Hall of Fame in 2008 (her first year of eligibility).

Outside of her works in music, Madonna has been nominated for the Saturn Award for Best Actress for her role in Dick Tracy (1990) and won the Golden Globe Award for Best Actress in a Musical or Comedy for starring in Evita (1996). However, she has also received "mocking" awards for her films, including nine Golden Raspberry Awards. Madonna was honored for her charitable works in helping cure AIDS, by the AIDS Project Los Angeles (APLA) in 1990 and American Foundation for AIDS Research (AmfAR) in 1991. Her documentary film I Am Because We Are (2008) received the VH1 Do Something! Award for bringing forward a social issue. At the 2019 GLAAD Media Awards, Madonna received the special honor of Advocate for Change. Madonna also won a number of accolades for her fashion, including five awards from the VH1 Fashion Awards as well as the Style Icon Award from the 2007 Elle Style Awards.

Awards and nominations

Other accolades

Critic lists

Mark Bego said that she appeared in several magazine's lists and mentions of "the biggest, best, and most defining events and creative productions of the century" (xx). In American Icons (2006), associate professor Diane Pecknold also noted how many polls of "the biggest, greatest, or best in popular culture includes her name".

See also 
List of Madonna records and achievements: Include most of her appearances at the Guinness World Records

International Best Dressed Hall of Fame List

Notes

References

Citations

Bibliography

Further reading

Other victories and nominations

Australian Music Awards — Billboard
ARIA Awards — Billboard
British Videogram Association (BVA) — Music Week
Cat's Compact Discs & Cassettes Awards — Billboard
Japan Music Life's Poll Awards — Billboard
Rolling Stone Music Awards — Rolling Stone
Rhino Awards — Billboard
Premios DAN (Chile) — UPI (2005)
Detroit Key to the City — Literary Hub
VH1 Viewers Vote — Billboard
Flash Film Festival

Others

Billi Awards by Billboard 
Clio Awards: 1990, 1999, 2001
Dorian Awards: 2015
MVPA Awards: 1999, 2000, 2001, 2003
National Music Publishers' Association (NMPA): Database

External links 
Awards for Madonna on the Internet Movie Database

Madonna
Madonna
Madonna